Iseo may refer to:

Acronyms
 International Sustainable Energy Organization (ISEO)

Places

Italy 
 Iseo, Lombardy, a comune in the Province of Brescia
 Lake Iseo, a lake in the Provinces of Bergamo and Brescia, Lombardy
 Provaglio d'Iseo, a comune in the Province of Brescia, Lombardy

South Korea 
 Iseo-myeon (disambiguation)
 Iseo-myeon, Cheongdo, a myeon in Cheongdo County, Gyeongsangbuk-do

Switzerland 
 Iseo, Switzerland, a former comune in the Canton of Ticino